Elements of the Infinite is the third studio album by American death metal band Allegaeon. The album was released on June 24, 2014 through Metal Blade Records. This is the band's first release with guitarist Michael Stancel and drummer Brandon Park, and last with original vocalist Ezra Haynes before his departure in 2015.

Track listing

Personnel
Allegaeon
 Ezra Haynes – lead vocals
 Greg Burgess – lead guitar, acoustic guitar, classical guitar, orchestration 
 Michael Stancel – rhythm guitar
 Corey Archuleta – bass, backing vocals
 Brandon Park – drums

Additional personnel
 Dave Otero – engineer, mastering 
 Shane Howard – editing
 Joe Ferris – arranger, composer, orchestration, sequencing 
 Collin Marks – artwork
 Brian James – layout

Charts

References

Allegaeon albums
2014 albums
Metal Blade Records albums